Óscar Priego, is a Mexican television actor, known for Relaciones peligrosas, 11-11: En mi cuadra nada cuadra, Dama y obrero and Señora Acero.

Filmography

References

External links
 

Mexican male telenovela actors
Male actors from Mexico City
21st-century Mexican male actors
Living people
Year of birth missing (living people)
Palo Duro High School alumni
People from Amarillo, Texas